Samuele Zoccarato (born 9 January 1998) is an Italian racing cyclist, who currently rides for UCI ProTeam .

Major results
2018
 1st Ruota d'Oro
 4th Gran Premio Industrie del Marmo
2019
 1st  Mountains classification, Tour du Jura Cycliste
 5th Piccolo Giro di Lombardia
2021
 3rd Road race, National Road Championships
 7th Trofeo Matteotti
 9th GP Slovenian Istria
2023
 1st  Mountains classification, Volta a la Comunitat Valenciana

Grand Tour general classification results timeline

References

External links

1998 births
Living people
Italian male cyclists
People from Camposampiero
Cyclists from the Province of Padua